The British Society of Cinematographers (abbreviated B.S.C. or BSC) was formed in 1949 by Bert Easey (23 August 1901 – 28 February 1973), the then head of the Denham and Pinewood studio camera departments, to represent British cinematographers in the British film industry. 

The stated objectives at the formation of the BSC were:
 To promote and encourage the pursuit of the highest standards in the craft of Motion Picture Photography.
 To further the applications by others of the highest standards in the craft of Motion Picture Photography and to encourage original and outstanding work.
 To co-operate with all whose aims and interests are wholly or in part related to those of the society.
 To provide facilities for social intercourse between the members and arrange lectures, debates and meetings calculated to further the objects of the Society.

There were originally 55 members. Currently, there are 256 full, honorary and associate members. For a British cinematographer, membership of the BSC is an affirmation of the high standard of their craft. The members of the British Society of Cinematographers are entitled to use BSC as postnominals in motion picture and television credits.

Notable Members
BSC members have won 22 Academy Awards over the last 95 years, for films ranging from Lawrence of Arabia to Blade Runner 2049. Below is a list of some of their most notable members
Jack Cardiff OBE BSC - First Cinematographer to be awarded an honorary Academy Award.
Geoffrey Unsworth OBE BSC - Cinematographer of Cabaret and Tess.
Oswald Morris OBE BSC - Cinematographer of Oliver! and Fiddler on the Roof.
Freddie Young OBE BSC - David Lean's Cinematographer shooting Lawrence of Arabia, Doctor Zhivago and Ryan's Daughter.
David Watkin BSC - Academy Award-winner for Out of Africa.
Freddie Francis BSC - Cinematographer of The Elephant Man and Glory.
Billy Williams OBE BSC - Cinematographer of Women in Love, On Golden Pond and Gandhi.
Gilbert Taylor BSC - Cinematographer of Star Wars.
Ted Moore BSC - Cinematographer of Dr. No, From Russia With Love, Goldfinger, Thunderball and Live and Let Die.
Sir Roger Deakins CBE ASC BSC - Cinematographer of Fargo, The Shawshank Redemption, The Assassination of Jesse James by the Coward Robert Ford, Skyfall and Blade Runner 2049.

Governance
The current President of British Society of Cinematographers is Christopher Ross BSC. The BSC Board of Governors is made up 18 Full Members and a co-opted member from the Associate Membership. The 2022-23 Board of Governors are:

Christopher Ross BSC - President
Ula Pontikos BSC - Vice-President
Laurie Rose BSC - Vice-President
Oliver Stapleton BSC - Vice-President
Stuart Bentley BSC
Balazs Bolygo BSC
Oliver Curtis BSC
John de Borman BSC AFC
James Friend ASC BSC
Adriano Goldman ASC BSC ABC
Angus Hudson BSC
Nina Kellgren BSC
Phil Méheux BSC
Stephen Murphy BSC ISC
Tim Palmer BSC
Kate Reid BSC
Nigel Walters BSC
Chris Plevin ACO - Co-opted Associate Member Representative

The BSC employs four members of staff. Audra Marshall serves as Secretary of the BSC, Frances Russell serves as Treasurer, Duncan Bruce serves as Membership Engagement and Social Media and Helen MacLean runs the BSC office.

In popular culture
In the 1981 film The Great Muppet Caper, Kermit and Fozzie comment on the opening credits as they appear. When the name of the film's cinematographer Oswald Morris with his post-nominal letters appears, Fozzie asks, "What does B.S.C. stand for?", to which Kermit perplexedly replies, "I don't know."

Award categories

Film 
 Best Cinematography in a Theatrical Feature Film
 Feature Operators Award

Television 
 Best Cinematography in a Television Drama
 TV Drama Operators Award

Other 
 Lifetime Achievement Award
 Charles D Staffell Award for Visual Effects
 BSC Bert Easey Technical Award
 Special Achievement Award
 BSC ARRI John Alcott Memorial Award

See also
 American Society of Cinematographers
 Australian Cinematographers Society
 Canadian Society of Cinematographers

References

External links

1949 establishments in the United Kingdom
 
Cinematography organizations
Entertainment industry societies
Film organisations in the United Kingdom
Film-related professional associations
Organizations established in 1949